Leutogi was a Polynesian goddess, originally a Samoan princess later turned goddess, and once worshiped in the Samoan archipelago in the central South Pacific ocean.

Myth
O Le pogai o le ao "Tonumaipe'a"

The Tuitoga Manaia had two wives, one was Tongan, and the other a Samoan. The latter, Leutogitupa'itea, was the daughter of Mulianalafai.  [Before she left Samoa, her brother, Taoulupo'o, counseled her that "if you come across trouble and need my help, send a sign to Samoa and I will see it"].

After some time the Tongan woman bore a child, but Leutogi remained childless. As the Tongan teased her on this account, she became very vexed and finally resolved to kill the child of the Tongan woman.

One day, both went together to their common bathing place. When they had reached it, the Tongan said, "Let me bathe first while you hold my little child." This Leutogi did, for she thought that the hour to revenge herself had come.

As soon as the Tongan was out of sight, she took a tuaniu [the thin hard spine of a coconut leaf often used in bunches to create a broom] and forced it into the brain [through the soft part of a baby's unformed skull located at its apex] of the baby. The Tongan hearing the sudden wild cry of her child, returned, but her child was already dead. Of course, Leutogi was suspected of having killed the child. Looking for proof of her suspicion, she soon found the tuaniu and told the evil deed to the Tuitonga, who became so angry that he ordered that Leutogi be burned alive.

[Remembering what her brother had told her, Leutogi went to the sea and stirred the water sending the angry waves to Samoa.  When Taoulupo'o saw the angry waves, he knew his sister was in trouble.  He would send his pet white pe'a (bat) to help Leutogi and before doing so, he called upon the spirits of the dead to assist his pet pe'a in its long flight across the ocean as the journey would prove too much for a creature on its own strength.  When the white pe'a arrived in Tonga, the spirits left the pe'a to do what it had come to do, thus leaving no way for it to return to Samoa.  The white pe'a rallied with the bats of Tonga to save Leutogi]. The unlucky woman was then dragged by the angry people into the bush and bound in the fork of a fetau tree. Soon a tall helping of dry wood surrounded her. Then the people set fire to it and, not willing to hear the shrieks of the miserable woman, they went back to their village. 

But, wonderful to relate, as soon as the flames began to rise, thousands of bats came to put out the fire by dropping on it their water. In this way, Leutogi's life was saved by the devoted bats.

When the attendants of the king found the woman still alive and the fire out, they were greatly surprised, Leutogi, then said to them in a friendly way, "Ua tatou fetaia'i i le magafetau soifua." (We meet under the fetau tree while yet full of life)

All this was told to the king. Thereupon he resolved to put Leutogi on a barren, uninhabited island. The island was haunted by a mischievous aitu [ghost, demon] named Losi, and the King, who knew this, felt certain that Losi would soon kill the woman. Losi, however, did not touch her for he thought she would soon die for want of food and water. So he simply sat down and watched the woman.

Great therefore was his surprise when the next day he saw a multitude of flying foxes, each bringing some kind of food to Leutogi. This the bats did for many days while Losi was looking on, wondering more than ever about the wonderful event.

After sometime, the Fijian Tuiaea happened to sail along that island. Leutogi called him and begged him to take her along with him. This he did gladly, and as she was a very nice looking woman, he married her and in due time, she bore him a son whom they called Fa'asega.

When the boy had grown up, she sent him back to Savai'i , but before he left, she gave him three titles to be taken to her family:

Tonumaipe'a – in memory of what the pe'a had done for her;
Tilomai – in memory of the aitu's looking on;
Tau'ili'ili – because she had to use stones to cover her oven, instead of leaves.

[Literal translation of Tonumaipe'a: Tonu = decision/plan, mai = from/bring, pe'a = flying fox]

Source: Henry, Fred. History of Samoa. Western Samoa: Commercial Printers, 1979. Print.  Items in brackets have been added through the family's recounting of this oral history.

See also
  Henry, Fred. History of Samoa. Western Samoa: Commercial Printers, 1979. Print.
 The Samoa flying fox in mythology
 The Minyades – three sisters in Greek mythology who were turned into bats and owls.  
 Camazotz – Mayan bat god
 Murcielago - Zapotec god of Death and night, represented as a bat.
 Tzinacan - Mayan and Aztec bat god
 Evaki/Ewaki - Brazilian goddess of night, sleep, dreams, and day, worshipped by the Bakairi people of Brazil and sometimes represented as a bat.  
 Nyctimene (mythology)
 Zhong Kui the Demon Queller with Five Bats

References

External links

 Leutogi, Encyclopedia of Goddesses and Heroines

Bats in religion
Lunar goddesses
Polynesian goddesses
Polynesian gods
Animal gods
Fertility goddesses
Night goddesses
Deified women